Cato Nathan was a state legislator in Mississippi. He represented Monroe County, Mississippi in the Mississippi House of Representatives in 1874 and 1875. He represented Monroe County, Mississippi.

He and A. P. Huggins were seated after an committee's investigation of the election.

He and others signed a letter opposed convict labor outside penitentiaries. He reportedly refused a deal from R. K. Bruce.

See also
African-American officeholders during and following the Reconstruction era

References

Year of birth missing
Year of death missing
Members of the Mississippi House of Representatives